Heart is the third greatest hits album by Japanese band Tokio. It was released on July 16, 2014, through J Storm. The album debuted atop the Oricon Albums Chart, selling 41,000 copies. It became Tokio's second number-one album in Japan and first number-one album since TOK10 (2004). The album was preceded by the lead single "Lyric", which reached number seven on the Oricon Singles Chart. In September 2014, the band embarked on an anniversary tour called Tokio 20th Anniversary Live Tour Heart.

Track listing

References 

2014 greatest hits albums
Tokio (band) albums
Japanese-language albums